The Vidovdan Heroes Chapel is a Serbian Orthodox chapel and mausoleum located on the Holy Archangels Georgije and Gavrilo Orthodox Cemetery located in Sarajevo, Bosnia and Herzegovina.

The crypt of the chapel contains the bodily remains of Gavrilo Princip and other members of Young Bosnia who took part in the assassination of Archduke Franz Ferdinand on 28 June 1914.

In 2019, the chapel was renovated.

Burials
The twelve people interred in the crypt of the chapel are Gavrilo Princip, Bogdan Žerajić, Vladimir Gaćinović, Nedeljko Čabrinović, Danilo Ilić, Veljko Čubrilović, Neđo Kerović, Mitar Kerović, Mihajlo Miško Jovanović, Jakov Milović, Trifko Grabež and Marko Perin.

Notes

References

External links

Buildings and structures completed in 1939
Chapels in Bosnia and Herzegovina
Mausoleums in Bosnia and Herzegovina
Tourist attractions in Sarajevo
V
Young Bosnia
Burials at Holy Archangels Cemetery, Sarajevo